Saraswatichandra is a black-and-white Hindi film released in 1968. It starred Nutan and Manish among others and was directed by Govind Saraiya.

The film was based on Saraswatichandra, a Gujarati novel, by Govardhanram Madhavram Tripathi, set in 19th-century feudalism in India. It also won the National Film Awards in the Best Cinematography and Best Music Director categories.

Story
Saraswatichandra tells the story of a young aristocrat, Saraswatichandra, whose marriage has been fixed with Kumud (Nutan), an educated girl from a rich family. Saraswati decides to cancel the engagement and writes to Kumud to inform her. However, she replies and the two continue exchanging letters. Saraswati decides to defy customs and pays a visit to his fiancée. A short-lived romance ensues. Saraswati returns home after promising Kumud and her family that he will return for her. However, a family feud takes place and Saraswati writes to Kumud that he will not able to marry her. This triggers a series of misunderstandings, ending up in Kumud's marriage to a rich but illiterate suitor named Pramad (Ramesh Deo). As soon as she joins her husband at his palace, he quickly disdains her for nautch girls, and hardly hides his double life, asking her not to comment on his "weakness".

Meanwhile, Saraswati, having forsaken his home, has been roaming the country, and reaches Pramad's mansion. His presence is made known to Kumud's father in-law, who despises his son's cheap life, and adopts the well-educated Saraswati as his secretary. The two former lovers meet, but Kumud is adamant to perform the duties of a faithful wife. Saraswati witnesses her anguished life and tries to reach out to her, but she objects. Nevertheless, things change, because Pramad’s behaviour grows more openly flirtatious. Kumud requests Saraswatichandra to stay away from her personal life and asks him to leave her in-laws' house. Determined to do whatever it takes to make her life easier, Saraswati decides to leave Kumud's life. On his way he is caught by dacoits and left for dead in the sun. A group of holy men spot him and take him away to their hermitage where he starts leading the life of a recluse.

Things darken for Kumud. She's chased away from Pramad’s mansion after he discovers one of Saraswati's letters. This gives Pramad the pretext he's been looking for: she must go back to her mother's house. Kumud's dignified attitude has earned her the friendship of women in her in-laws’ household, and they reveal to Pramad’s parents that he has chased his wife out of lust and selfishness. Pramad is thrown out of his house and he vows never to return. After leaving her in-laws' house, a disheartened Kumud tries to drown in the river but is retrieved by some holy women on the banks. They take her to the same temple where Saraswati is trying to atone for his sins.

The two lovers come face to face for one more time. Kumud submits to her fate and accepts the senior sister’s advice that she must do something for Saraswati. The latter, on the other hand, has a mission to fulfill: told by the guru that Pramad is dead, he will have to break the news to Kumud. A (very static) meeting is organised: after having realised that their fate has again brought them together, they admit that they are made for each other, and love blossoms between them. But Kumud doesn’t know she’s a widow, and still hangs on to the hope that she might change her husband.

When Saraswati reluctantly tells her, he faces a new Kumud, who must now embrace the widow’s status. The film ends with Saraswati accepting Kumud's request of marrying her younger sister, Kusum.

Cast

 Nutan as Kumud Sundari
 Manish as Saraswati Chandra / Navin Chander
 Vijaya Choudhury as Kusum
 Ramesh Deo as Pramad
 Sulochana Latkar as Kumud's mother
 B. M. Vyas as Kumud's grandfather
 Seema Deo as Alak
 Jeevan Kala
 S.B. Nayampalli as Pramad's father
 Sulochana Chatterjee as Pramad's mother
 Babu Raje
 Dulari as Saraswati Chandra's step-mother
 Shivraj as Saraswati Chandra's father
 Surendra
 Praveen Paul as Kumud's aunt

Soundtrack 

All the songs were composed by Kalyanji Anandji and lyrics were penned by Indeevar.

Awards and recognition
 1969, National Film Awards
 Best Cinematography, Nariman Irani
 Best Music Director, Kalyanji-Anandji
 1969, Filmfare Best Dialogue Award, S. Ali Raza

See also
 National Film Awards
 Filmfare Awards
 Filmfare Best Dialogue Award
 Saraswatichandra (disambiguation)

References

External links
 

1968 films
1960s Hindi-language films
Indian black-and-white films
Films based on Indian novels
Films scored by Kalyanji Anandji
Indian feudalism
Films whose cinematographer won the Best Cinematography National Film Award